Ayutthaya Warrior Football Club is a defunct Thailand football club based in Ayutthaya province. In 2016 the club participates in Regional League Division 2 (Central Region) the third tier of Thai football league system. 

The club borrowed a league status of Phichit F.C. to join Regional League Division 2. In 2017 the team collapsed to combine with Ayutthaya United and dissolved Ayutthaya Warrior.

Stadium and locations

Season By Season Record

Honours
Regional League Central Division
Winners (1): 2016

References

External links
 Official Facebookpage of Ayutthaya Warrior

Association football clubs established in 2016
Association football clubs disestablished in 2017
Defunct football clubs in Thailand
Football clubs in Thailand
Phra Nakhon Si Ayutthaya province
2016 establishments in Thailand
2017 disestablishments in Thailand